Razlivka is a rural locality (a selo) in Rudnyanskoye Urban Settlement, Rudnyansky District, Volgograd Oblast, Russia. The population was 14 as of 2010.

Geography 
Razlivka is located in forest steppe, on the right bank of the Tersa River, 15 km west of Rudnya (the district's administrative centre) by road. Ilmen is the nearest rural locality.

References 

Rural localities in Rudnyansky District, Volgograd Oblast